CaringBridge Inc. is a charitable 501(c)(3) non-profit organization established in 1997 which allows people facing various medical conditions and their family and friends to communicate. CaringBridge is the first non-profit social network with global reach whose mission is to connect loved ones during a health journey through personal, private websites. CaringBridge prioritizes privacy with no advertisements or selling of user data. People who are provided with an individual's personal website address (URL) and password can read updates on the individual's condition or post messages to the family as needed. CaringBridge is headquartered in Eagan, Minnesota. All CaringBridge sites are free and CaringBridge is funded by donor support. Since its inception, over 740,000 CaringBridge sites have been created by people all over the world.

Purpose
CaringBridge allows patients, caregivers, families, and friends to exchange information about a patient's medical condition on an ongoing basis. The websites are designed to become conduits between patients, their families, friends, neighbors, and colleagues. When visiting an individual’s website, visitors can post messages of support, donate to GoFund Me accounts, or send donations.

History
CaringBridge was created in 1997 by Sona Mehring when her close friend gave premature birth to a daughter. The site was intended to keep family and friends informed about the child.
 1997: Sona Mehring creates the original CaringBridge website
 1998: More than 50 sites established on the platform
 2000: Donor support begins
 2001: Board of directors established
 2002: Nonprofit status granted
 2005: Donations reach $1 million
 2006: More than 5,000 sites established
 2007: First national media coverage
 2009: Spanish-language support added
 2012: 132,000 donors; 110 volunteers
2021: Tia Newcomer replaces Liwanag Ojala as Chief Executive Officer

Affiliations
CaringBridge is a member of the National Health Council.
CaringBridge is listed as an accredited Better Business Bureau (BBB) charity.
CaringBridge is affiliated with Community Health Charities of America.

See also
 Social network service
 Virtual community

References

External links
 
 Organizational Profile – National Center for Charitable Statistics (Urban Institute)
Charities Navigator 

 Health charities in the United States
Health informatics organizations
 Organizations established in 1997
 Charities based in Minnesota
 Medical and health organizations based in Minnesota
1997 establishments in Minnesota